Wilma Smith (born 1956) is a Fijian-born violinist.  She was born in Suva, Fiji and raised in Auckland, New Zealand. She has been concertmaster of the New Zealand Symphony Orchestra, and co-concertmaster of the Melbourne Symphony Orchestra in Australia from 2003-2014.  She plays a 1761 Guadagnini violin.

Career
Born in Fiji, Smith studied at Auckland University and had an early professional experience with the Auckland Symphonia (now Philharmonia) and New Zealand Symphony Orchestra. She then continued her studies in Boston at the New England Conservatory with Dorothy DeLay and Louis Krasner, playing in masterclasses for many others including Josef Gingold, Yehudi Menuhin and Sándor Végh. Smith was the founding first violinist of the Lydian String Quartet, prizewinners at Evian, Banff and Portsmouth International Competitions and winners of the Naumburg Award for Chamber Music. Although the Lydian String Quartet was Smith's professional focus in Boston, she also worked regularly in the Boston Symphony Orchestra and led the Harvard Chamber Orchestra, the Handel and Haydn Society and Banchetto Musicale, a period instrument baroque orchestra.

New Zealand String Quartet (1987)
An invitation to form the New Zealand String Quartet took her back to Wellington in 1987 and she was first violinist of the quartet until her appointment as Concertmaster of the New Zealand Symphony Orchestra in 1993. During her years with the quartet they toured New Zealand and Australia extensively and performed at the Tanglewood Festival. Prior to her departure for Melbourne, the NZSO honoured her with the title of Concertmaster Emeritus.

Melbourne Symphony Orchestra
Wilma Smith became Concertmaster of the Melbourne Symphony Orchestra (MSO) in 2003.  The MSO's Chief Conductor Sir Andrew Davis has stated that, of all the performances of Ralph Vaughan Williams's The Lark Ascending he has conducted, Wilma Smith's was "unquestionably the most beautiful".  He describes her as "an exceptional musician with whom [he] felt an immediate rapport".

In June 2013 she announced her retirement from the MSO from the end of the 2014 season.

Musical partnerships and collaborations
Smith has enjoyed a longstanding duo partnership with pianist Michael Houstoun, and since moving to Melbourne has formed the Munro/Smith/Berlin Trio with Ian Munro (piano) and David Berlin (cello) with whom she has performed regularly in New Zealand and Australia. In the last two years she has been a frequent guest with another Melbourne group, Ensemble Liaison, whose core is clarinet, cello and piano but who expand with other instruments to perform a widely varied and eclectic repertoire. The 2008 International Festival of the Arts in Wellington provided an opportunity for three concerts of chamber music collaboration with Steven Isserlis (cello), Melvyn Tan (piano), Houstoun (piano) and Carolyn Henbest (viola). The connection with Isserlis continued in 2009 with Smith's participation in his Open Chamber Music Seminar at Prussia Cove in Cornwall, England.

Teaching
Smith is also a teacher of violin at the University of Melbourne, and privately.

Personal
Smith lives with her partner, Peter Watt, a computer consultant and ex-trombonist, and their three daughters, Jessye, Rosie and Sophie.

References

Wilma Smith bio at MSO web site

Fijian musicians
1956 births
Living people
People from Auckland
University of Auckland alumni
New Zealand classical violinists
Australian classical violinists
Concertmasters
Violin pedagogues
Australian music educators
New Zealand Symphony Orchestra people
Fijian emigrants to New Zealand
New England Conservatory alumni
21st-century classical violinists
Women classical violinists